Extreme cold weather clothing refers to clothing for arctic or mountainous areas. Its primary function is to trap air as an insulator to prevent heat loss from the wearer's body. Secondary and necessary is to conduct water vapor away from the body to keep the insulating layers dry. A shell keeps the wind from disturbing the still air in the insulating layers.  In warmer conditions, the shell protects from water intrusion.

In these conditions, the unprotected skin of a healthy adult will develop frostbite in ten to twenty minutes. The Canadian standard includes lower temperatures.

Principles
A vacuum is the best insulator, but its use in clothing is impractical. Dry air is a practical insulator. Extreme cold weather clothing uses still dry air to insulate the body,  layers of loose air trapping material are most effective.  The inner layers should conduct moisture away from the body.  Outer layers should be windproof as well as suitable to the harsh terrain.

Materials
The original cold weather clothing was made of furs. The fibers of the fur trapped insulating air; lanolin on the fur repelled water. Knitted wool was an effective insulator, but ineffective when wet. Goose down is the lightest insulator, and still used today. Its quality, called loft is a measure of its low density. It is ineffective when wet. 

Artificial fibers have good loft, and do not lose it when wet. One effective fiber is Hollofil a hollow fiber of polyolefin.  Outer garments are often made of nylon, which is strong and abrasion resistant.  To the nylon is often bonded to a layer of polytetrafluoroethylene (trade name Teflon) in a form that has holes small enough for moisture to escape, but not allow liquid water to intrude. This material is trade named Gore-Tex.

Best practices
The U.S. Army describes cold weather best practices by the mnemonic acronym COLD.
 Clean
 Avoid Overheating
 Loose
 Dry
The protocol is aimed at keeping the insulation dry, so that it may be most effective.

Layering
Best practice indicates that for extreme conditions, clothing should be layered and loose. Near the core of the body, a soft, wicking layer is best. Wool or silk underwear is preferred. Then, by preference, a knitted layer of wool or synthetic fleece. A massive insulating layer and a windproof layer complete the ensemble.

Parts of clothing

Inner layer
Underwear, inner socks, and glove liners are typically thin soft knits of silk, wool, or synthetic.

First insulating layer
Typically knit wool or synthetic fleece.  A common material is polar fleece.

Massive insulating layer
Down or synthetic fiber sewn into bats of a (typically nylon) coat or pants.

Wind layer
The usual clothing for Arctic or mountain regions is a parka.  A tightly woven fabric prevents wind from disturbing the still air in the insulating layers.

Footwear

Footwear is chosen according to purpose.  In alpine conditions, insulated mountaineering boots are used. In other work conditions, pacs, or bunny boots, with rubber soles and thick, removable wool felt liners are used.  In camp, lightweight moon boots of foam and nylon are common. In the tent, down booties are comfortable.

Gloves
In severe conditions, mittens with long gauntlets are preferred.

Headwear
A knitted or fleece cap is worn underneath the hood of the parka. The face is protected by a mask or balaclava. The water transmission properties of anything touching the face are of the highest concern.

Another option is to use heated clothing, which contains battery-powered electrical heating elements or gel packs.

See also

Sportswear (activewear)
Extended Cold Weather Clothing System
Environmental suit

References

Environmental suits
Sportswear
Protective gear